Louise Zoé Coste or Louise Zoé Meynier (27 September 1805 – 24 September 1890) was a French painter. She was the daughter of the painter Jean-Baptiste Coste and a student of Jean-Baptiste Regnault. She mainly worked in Nantes and exhibited at the Paris Salon from 1831 to 1861.

Known works 

 Young man meditating by a tree, 1881

References

1805 births
1890 deaths
French women painters
19th-century French painters
19th-century French women artists